Abell 576 is a galaxy cluster in the constellation Lynx. Detailed study has revealed that there are two clusters in the process of merging.

References

Lynx (constellation)
576
Galaxy clusters